The 2022 Atlantic Coast Conference men's soccer season was the 69th season of men's varsity soccer in the conference.

Clemson were the defending champions of the Atlantic Conference and Pittsburgh were the defending champions of the Coastal Conference.  Notre Dame were the defending ACC Tournament Champion.

Eight ACC teams were invited to the 2021 NCAA Tournament.  Clemson had the best showing of the eight, winning their third title in program history.

Syracuse won the Atlantic Conference with a 5–1–2 record and Duke won the Costal Conference. Syracuse went on to win the ACC Tournament 2–0 over eighth seed Clemson in the final.

In 2022, eight ACC teams were again invided to the NCAA Tournament.  Clemson was unable to defend its title, but another ACC team Syracuse, claimed the title with a penalty shoot-out victory over Indiana.

Teams

Stadiums and locations 

Note: Florida State, Georgia Tech and Miami (FL) are members of the Atlantic Coast Conference but do not sponsor men's soccer.

Personnel 

Notes
Records shown are prior to the 2022 season
Years at school includes the 2022 season
ACC records include only years with current school.

Preseason

Hermann Trophy 

The ACC placed four players on the watch-list, which was announced on August 25.

Preseason Poll 

The 2022 ACC Preseason Poll was released on August 16, 2022.  The league's head coaches ranked Clemson as the preseason favorite, with 7 out of 12 votes.  Full results of the poll are shown below:

Preseason awards 

Preseason All-ACC Watchlist

Regular Season 

All times Eastern time.

Week 1 (Aug. 21 – Aug. 29)

Players of the Week

Week 2 (Aug. 30 – Sep. 5) 

Players of the Week

Week 3 (Sep. 6 – Sep. 12)

Players of the Week

Week 4 (Sep. 13 – Sep. 19) 

Players of the Week

Week 5 (Sep. 20 – Sep. 26) 

Players of the Week

Week 6 (Sep. 27 – Oct. 3) 

Players of the Week

Week 7 (Oct. 4 – Oct. 10) 

Players of the Week

Week 8 (Oct. 11 – Oct. 17) 

Players of the Week

Week 9 (Oct. 18 – Oct. 24) 

Players of the Week

Week 10 (Oct. 25 – Oct. 29) 

Players of the Week

Rankings

United Soccer Coaches

Top Drawer Soccer

Postseason

ACC Tournament

NCAA Tournament 

The ACC had eight teams receive a bid to the 2022 NCAA Tournament, which was the highest number of bids for any conference.  Four teams claimed top eight seeds, which was also the most among any conference.

Awards

All-ACC awards and teams

MLS SuperDraft 

The ACC had sixteen players selected in the 2023 draft, the most by any conference.  The ACC had the top two selections and seven overall first round picks.  National Champions Syracuse lead the league with five overall picks. Clemson had the first overall pick for the second time in four drafts.  No other school has had two top-five picks in the past four seasons.

Total picks by school

List of selections

Homegrown players 

The Homegrown Player Rule is a Major League Soccer program that allows MLS teams to sign local players from their own development academies directly to MLS first team rosters. Before the creation of the rule in 2008, every player entering Major League Soccer had to be assigned through one of the existing MLS player allocation processes, such as the MLS SuperDraft.

To place a player on its homegrown player list, making him eligible to sign as a homegrown player, players must have resided in that club's home territory and participated in the club's youth development system for at least one year. Players can play college soccer and still be eligible to sign a homegrown contract.

References 

2022 Atlantic Coast Conference men's soccer season
Atlantic Coast Conference